Robert E. Burke (born 1942) is a retired American football coach. He served as the head football coach at American International College in Springfield, Massachusetts from 1976 to 1982.

Burke played college football at the University of Massachusetts in Amherst, Massachusetts.

References

1942 births
Living people
American International Yellow Jackets football coaches
UMass Minutemen football players
High school football coaches in Florida
High school football coaches in Massachusetts
Sportspeople from Holyoke, Massachusetts
Players of American football from Massachusetts
Coaches of American football from Massachusetts